Oulad Daoud Zkhanine (Tarifit: Wlad Dawed, ⵡⵍⴰⴷ ⴷⴰⵡⴻⴷ; Arabic: اولاد داوود زخانين) is a commune in the Nador Province of the Oriental administrative region of Morocco. At the time of the 2004 census, the commune had a total population of 3666 people living in 750 households.

References

Populated places in Nador Province
Rural communes of Oriental (Morocco)